Progress M-22M, identified by NASA as Progress 54P, is a Progress spacecraft used by Roskosmos to resupply the International Space Station (ISS) during 2014. Progress M-22M was built by RKK Energia. Progress M-22M was launched on a six-hours rendezvous profile towards the ISS. The 22nd Progress-M 11F615A60 spacecraft to be launched, it had the serial number 422.

Launch
The spacecraft was launched on 5 February 2014 at 16:23:32 UTC from the Baikonur Cosmodrome in Kazakhstan. The launch was the first Russian orbital launch of 2014.

Docking

Progress M-22M docked with the Pirs docking compartment on 5 February at 22:22 UTC, less than six hours after launch.

Cargo
The Progress spacecraft carries 2370 kg of cargo and supplies to the International Space Station.

Undocking and Reentry
Progress M-22M undocked from the ISS on 7 April 2014, and was deorbited on 18 April 2014 after supporting a scientific experiment in free-fly mode.

References

Progress (spacecraft) missions
Spacecraft launched in 2014
Spacecraft which reentered in 2014
2014 in Russia
Spacecraft launched by Soyuz-U rockets
Supply vehicles for the International Space Station